Alluttoq Island is a large , uninhabited island in Avannaata municipality in western Greenland, located in the northern part of Disko Bay, in the outlet of the Sullorsuaq Strait, east of Disko Island.

Settlement 
Ataa, located on the eastern coast of the island, is an abandoned settlement, with the last families leaving the village around  1960. The closest populated settlements are Qeqertaq in the northeast, on an island off the shore of Nuussuaq Peninsula−and Oqaatsut in the southeast, on the mainland.

See also
List of islands of Greenland

References 

Disko Bay
Uninhabited islands of Greenland